John Paulding (October 16, 1758 – February 18, 1818) was an American militiaman from the state of New York during the American Revolution. In 1780, he was one of three men who captured Major John André, a British spy associated with the treason of Continental general and commandant of West Point Benedict Arnold. Andre was convicted and hanged.

American Revolution
While visiting his future wife, Sarah Tidd, Paulding was captured by Tories, or Loyalists, led by his future brother-in-law. He was held in the notorious "Sugar House" prison in New York City in 1780, then occupied by  British forces. He escaped by jumping from a window. He went to the livery stable of a friend and acquired a German military Jäger or Hessian coat, green with red trim, associated with the British mercenaries, which he wore to evade notice.

As part of an armed patrol in Westchester County, with fellow militiamen David Williams and Isaac Van Wart, Paulding seized British Major John André, who had left Benedict Arnold after discussing the latter's defection to the British and betrayal of the patriots. This site is now commemorated as Patriot's Park in Tarrytown, New York. André, seeing Paulding's Hessian coat, may have assumed him to be a member of the "cowboys," or pro-British marauders who raided the Neutral Ground for cattle and supplies. Searching André for valuables, they discovered documents of his secret communication with Benedict Arnold. The militiamen, all local yeomen farmers, refused André's attempt to bribe them, and delivered the officer to the Continental Army. Arnold's plans to surrender West Point to the British were revealed and foiled, and André was convicted and hanged as a spy.

With George Washington's personal recommendation, the United States Congress awarded Paulding, Williams, and Van Wart the first military decoration of the United States, the silver medal known as the Fidelity Medallion. Each of the three also received federal pensions of $200 a year. New York State granted them each lands for farms.

The celebrated trio were commemorated far and wide as popular heroes after the patriots won the war. By an act of Congress, the new state of Ohio (1803) included the counties named Paulding, Van Wert (anglicized spelling), and Williams. Paulding was held in particularly high regard by early American historians, as the standard 19th-century accounts credited him with the decision-making and initiative at the scene. 

Though hailed as national heroes, Paulding and the others also received criticism. The divisions in society continued after the war. At his trial André insisted the men were mere brigands; sympathy for Andre remained among some more elite American quarters, which included some Loyalists.  (André's reputation was high in England, where his body was returned and he was buried in Westminster Abbey). Representative Benjamin Tallmadge of Connecticut, who had been present as an American officer in Westchester County in 1780 and had a low opinion of the three common militiamen, had accepted André's account of his capture and search. Tallmadge argued in Congress for the rejection of  a requested pension increase in 1817 for Paulding. He assailed the credibility and motivations of the three captors.

Despite this slight, the men's popular acclaim generally increased throughout the 19th century, although opinion on their motives and actions remained divided. Some modern scholars have interpreted the episode as a major event in early American cultural development, representing the apotheosis of the "common man" in the new democratic society.

Personal life
Paulding was born on October 16, 1758, at the Paulding homestead near Tarrytown in Peekskill in the Province of New York in what was then British America.  He was the son of Joseph Paulding.

Paulding was a self-sufficient yeoman farmer and was described as a strong, sturdy man, standing more than six feet tall, unusual for the era.  Paulding married three times in his life, and lost two wives to death.  In total he had nineteen children by them.   On April 21, 1781, he was married to Sarah Tidd (1767–1789) of Salem, New York.

After Sarah's death on October 23, 1789, he remarried to Esther Ward (1768–1804) on November 18, 1790.  Esther was the daughter of Caleb Ward and Mary (née Drake) Ward. Together, they were the parents of:

 Hiram Paulding (1797–1878), a Rear Admiral in the United States Navy, who served from the War of 1812 until after the Civil War

Esther died in 1804 and in 1806, he married for the third time to Hester Denike (d. 1855), the daughter of Isaac Denike of Peekskill.

He died in 1818 at Staatsburg, Dutchess County, New York of natural causes. His last words were reported to be: "I die a true republican."  He was buried in the cemetery of Old Saint Peter's Church in Van Cortlandtville, Cortlandt Manor.

Descendants
Paulding's descendants are numerous but perhaps the best-known of them is his son Hiram Paulding (b.1797 - d.1878), who served in the War of 1812 and fought in the Battle of Lake Champlain; he rose to become a Rear Admiral in the United States Navy and retired only after the end of the American Civil War.

Relations
Among his extended family were cousins James Kirke Paulding, the U.S. Secretary of the Navy under President Martin Van Buren; William Paulding Jr., who served as mayor of New York City, a U.S. Representative and the Adjutant General of New York; and Julia Paulding, who married U.S. Representative William Irving (brother of author and diplomat Washington Irving).

Legacy

Paulding's grave is marked by a large marble monument with the epitaph:

FIDELITY - On the morning of the 23rd of September 1780, accompanied by two young farmers of the county of West Chester, he intercepted the British spy, André. Poor himself, he disdained to acquire wealth by the sacrifice of his country. Rejecting the temptation of great rewards, he conveyed his prisoner to the American camp and, by this noble act of self-denial, the treason of Arnold was detected; the designs of the enemy baffled; West Point and the American Army saved; and these United States, now by the grace of God Free and Independent, rescued from most imminent peril.

In 1853, a monument was erected at the site of André's capture in Tarrytown. On the event's centenary in 1880, it was topped with the statue of a minuteman. Carved by the sculptor William Rudolf O'Donovan (1844–1920), the statue is reputedly in the likeness of Paulding himself. It is located in Patriot's Park, which was added to the National Register of Historic Places in 1982. A street called Paulding Drive in Chappaqua, New York was named in his honor.

According to Marcius D. Raymond, several villages and counties are named in his honor: Paulding County, Ohio; Paulding County, Georgia; Paulding, Michigan (site of the mysterious Paulding Light); Paulding, New Jersey; and Paulding, Mississippi. Additionally, the villages of Tarrytown (where there is  a John Paulding Elementary School), Cold Spring and Elmsford, along with the cities of Peekskill and White Plains, all in New York, each have a street named for Paulding (as well as ones for Williams and Van Wart). The Fire Department of Sparkill, New York, maintains the John Paulding Engine Co., founded in 1901.

References

External link

1758 births
1818 deaths
Continental Army soldiers
New York (state) militiamen in the American Revolution
People from Staatsburg, New York
Paulding County, Georgia
Paulding County, Ohio
People from Cortlandt Manor, New York
People of the Province of New York
Burials in New York (state)